Road racing, road race of road racer may refer to:

 Road racing in motorsport
 Road running on foot
 Road bicycle racing
 Road Race, initial name of 1976 arcade game Fonz (video game)
 Roadracers (1994 film)
 Roadracers (1959 film)
 Roadracer Records, subsidiary of Roadrunner Records

See also
 Racing
 Roadrunner (disambiguation)